is a Japanese singer and songwriter. Her song "Sabrina" was used as the third ending song of the anime television series Toriko and her song "Silly" was used as the theme song for the television adaption of popular novel "Nのために" ("For N").

Her stage name comes from the movie Léon: The Professional, and also comes from Leo of Kimba the White Lion because her eyes resemble a lion.

Biography 
Ieiri was born in Kurume and grew up in Fukuoka. She wanted to be a singer at the age of 13 and came to study under  presided over by record producer Yoshihiko Nishio, who has produced Ayaka and Yui.

In the spring of 2011, she left home and went to Tokyo alone, leaving her parents. She continued doing musical activities while going to the high school in Tokyo and made her debut on 15 February 2012.

On 18 February 2014, a music video for the song "A Boy", which has an animated part made by Tezuka Productions, features an anime version of the singer (based on Kimba and modeled after the singer) which meets other characters from the Kimba the White Lion series.

Discography

Albums

Studio albums

Compilation albums

Live albums

Singles

Promotional singles

Video albums

Filmography

Awards

Japan Record Awards
The Japan Record Awards is a major music awards show held annually in Japan by the Japan Composer's Association.

|-
|rowspan=2| 2012
|rowspan=2| Leo Ieiri
| New Artist Award
| 
|-
| Best New Artist Award
| 
|-
|rowspan=2| 2013
|rowspan=2| Leo Ieiri
| Excellent Music Award
| 
|-
| Grand Prix
| 
|}

Mnet Asian Music Awards

The Mnet Asian Music Awards is a major annual Korean Awards ceremony. 

|-
|rowspan=1| 2014
|rowspan=1| Leo Ieiri
| Asian Artist of the Year in Japan
| 
|}

Space Shower Music Awards

|-
|rowspan=1| 2016
|rowspan=1| Leo Ieiri
| Best Female Artist
| 
|}

Television Drama Academy Awards

|-
|rowspan=1| 2015
|rowspan=1|  Kimi ga Kureta Natsu 
| Best Theme song
| 
|-
| 2014
| Silly
|Best Theme song
| 
|}

Tie-Ups

Notes

References

External links
 
 

1994 births
Living people
People from Kurume
Japanese women pop singers
Japanese women singer-songwriters
Japanese singer-songwriters
Musicians from Fukuoka Prefecture
Ken-On artists
21st-century Japanese women singers
21st-century Japanese singers